Magnus J. Carnahan House is a historic home located at Washington, Daviess County, Indiana.  It was built between 1896 and 1902, and is a -story, Queen Anne style brick dwelling on a raised basement. It features a round corner tower with a conical roof, one-story porch and balcony, and complex hipped and gable roof. Also on the property is a contributing carriage house.

It was added to the National Register of Historic Places in 1991.

References

Washington, Indiana
Houses on the National Register of Historic Places in Indiana
Queen Anne architecture in Indiana
Houses completed in 1902
Houses in Daviess County, Indiana
National Register of Historic Places in Daviess County, Indiana